Tanaya Beatty (born February 12, 1991) is a Canadian actress. She is known for her role as Rachel Black in the movie adaptation of The Twilight Saga: Breaking Dawn - Part 1 as well as her starring roles as Jessica Finch in True Justice, Caitlin Javier on the hit Canadian television series Arctic Air, and Sacagawea in the upcoming HBO miniseries Lewis and Clark.  In 2016 she was added to the cast of NBC's The Night Shift as Dr. Shannon Rivera. In 2018 she had the lead role as Annie in a film adaptation of Joseph Boyden's novel Through Black Spruce and as Avery in Yellowstone.

Early life
Tanaya Beatty was born on February 12, 1991, in Vancouver, British Columbia. Beatty's mother is of Awaetlatla First Nations descent and her father of Himalayan descent. She was adopted and raised by an Italian family. Beatty spent her childhood living in the interior of British Columbia, including Midway, Nelson, and Grand Forks.

Career
In December 2010, Beatty graduated from the Vancouver Film School, successfully completing the full-time Essentials and Acting Program. Prior to this, she earned a certificate from a social work program.

Beatty has been included in the group of Native American actresses considered with "both the talent and the beauty to be an A-List", and was cast in the role of Sacagawea for the planned HBO miniseries, Lewis and Clark,  which has been in development hell since 2016. In 2017, she appeared opposite Christian Bale and Wes Studi in Hostiles. She has the lead role in Through Black Spruce, an adaptation of Joseph Boyden's novel of the same name.

Filmography

Film

Television

References

External links
 

Living people
1991 births
Actresses from Vancouver
Vancouver Film School alumni
Canadian film actresses
Canadian television actresses
20th-century Canadian actresses
21st-century Canadian actresses